Robert Towers (born August 19, 1936) is an American actor who has appeared in many television shows, including Star Trek: The Next Generation. He also played Buster the coke-snorting jockey on It's Always Sunny in Philadelphia in season 3 episode "The Gang Gets Whacked".  He played the teenage Benjamin in the feature film, The Curious Case of Benjamin Button. Towers provided the speaking and singing voice of Snoopy in You're a Good Man, Charlie Brown.

Filmography

Animated roles
 Doctor Dolittle – Various Animals
 Kidd Video – Cool Cat
 Pole Position – Additional Voices
 You're a Good Man, Charlie Brown – Snoopy (speaking/singing)

Television roles
 Star Trek: The Next Generation – Rata
 Angel - High Priest
 The Banana Splits – Snorky (in-suit performer)
 Hannah Montana – Albert Einstein
 Victorious – Tuberculosis Patient
 Bunk'd – Gerald Barker (episode: "Finders Keepers, Lou's A Weeper")
 Raven's Home – Commando Joe
 Perry Mason - Thread Factory Owner

Film roles
 Masters of the Universe – Karg
 Switch – Mental Patient
 The Curious Case of Benjamin Button – Benjamin Button (teenage Benjamin)
 Rockin' with Judy Jetson – Additional Voices

Video game roles
 Star Trek: 25th Anniversary Enhanced – Crewman #1, Biabli, Lights
 Stonekeep – Rek, Sharga Rebel

External links

1936 births
Living people
American male film actors
American male television actors
American male voice actors
Male actors from New York (state)
People from Long Island
21st-century American male actors
20th-century American male actors